The Unknown Soldier is a Finnish film from 1985 directed by Rauni Mollberg. It is based on the best selling Finnish novel by the same name written by Väinö Linna. It is the second film adaptation of Linna's novel, the first one being the 1955 film of the same title, directed by Edvin Laine. Third film adaptation of the same novel was released in 2017, directed by Aku Louhimies.

It was screened in the Un Certain Regard section at the 1986 Cannes Film Festival. The film was selected as the Finnish entry for the Best Foreign Language Film at the 59th Academy Awards, but was not accepted as a nominee. The film received three Jussi Awards: Mollberg for directing and actors Risto Tuorila as Koskela and Paavo Liski as Rokka.

Synopsis 
Set against the events of the Finnish Continuation war, the film follows a machine gun troop's journey into the Soviet Union. The troop includes the simple-minded Hietanen, the jokey Vanhala, the cynical Lahtinen, the cowardly Riitaoja and grumpy Lehto. The film also follows the command officers, such as the happy and slightly senile Captain Kaarna, the young and idealistic Captain Kariluoto and the strict and unsympathetic Lieutenant Lammio. They face many struggles, such as seeing the supportive Kaarna die in their first battle and three of the soldiers refusing to leave their punishment post during an air-raid, as well as defending the trenches after the Finns have taken back parts of Karelia. Partway through their journey, the troop is joined by Rokka, a Karelian veteran of the Winter War, who also clashes with Lammio due to having little respect for military discipline, despite being an excellent and capable soldier.

Cast
 Risto Tuorila – Koskela 
 Pirkka-Pekka Petelius – Hietanen 
 Paavo Liski – Rokka 
 Mika Mäkelä – Rahikainen 
 Pertti Koivula – Lahtinen 
 Tero Niva – Vanhala 
 Ossi-Ensio Korvuo – Määttä 
 Mikko Niskanen – Salo 
 Pauli Poranen – Lehto 
 Hannu Kivioja – Riitaoja 
 Juha Riihimäki – Sihvonen 
 Seppo Juusonen – Susi 
 Timo Virkki – Honkajoki 
 Vesa Ala-Seppälä – Hauhia 
 Risto Hetta – Vuorela

Production
Mollberg used young and unknown actors, many of whom are now famous. The film was shot in color with much hand-held footage, attempting to portray the story more realistically than the prior Edvin Laine version. This has often led to unfavorable comparisons with the better-known 1955 adaption. Although a full musical score was composed for the movie, Mollberg released the finished film without it for stylistic reasons.

See also
 List of submissions to the 59th Academy Awards for Best Foreign Language Film
 List of Finnish submissions for the Academy Award for Best Foreign Language Film

References

External links
 
 
 

1985 films
Eastern Front of World War II films
Films based on military novels
Films directed by Rauni Mollberg
Films set in Finland
Films set in the Soviet Union
Films set in 1941
Films set in 1942
Films set in 1943
Films set in 1944
1980s Finnish-language films
Films based on Finnish novels
Films based on works by Väinö Linna
Films shot in Finland
1980s war films
Finnish World War II films